Staverton railway station is situated on the South Devon Railway, a heritage railway in Devon, England. It serves the village of Staverton.

History
The station was opened by the Buckfastleigh, Totnes and South Devon Railway on 1 May 1872. The railway was amalgamated into the Great Western Railway in 1897 and this in turn was nationalised into British Railways on 1 January 1948.

The station closed to passengers on 3 November 1958 although goods traffic continued until 10 September 1962. It was re-opened by the Dart Valley Railway, a heritage railway, on 5 April 1969. The South Devon Railway Trust took over the running of the line on 1 January 1991.

Description
There is a single platform on the north side of the line. There is a small brick building which houses the ticket office and two former goods sheds. There is a level crossing at the Totnes end of the station and a small signal box opposite the platform.

Services
The station is served by trains on all operating days of the South Devon Railway. Trains operate daily from late March to the end of October. On most days, a single train set operates, providing four journeys a day in each direction. On busy days, two train sets may operate, providing more journeys.

Film and television
The station has appeared in several films and television programmes.

In the 1950 film Guilt Is My Shadow it was the fictitious 'Welford' station and GWR 1400 Class number 1470 was seen. It was again used in 1955 for the film Where There's a Will, the locomotive this time being number 1439.

It was used as a location in Five Go Mad in Dorset, the first "The Comic Strip" comedy television series in 1982, and in the BBC's 2016 Full Steam Ahead railway history series.

References

External links
Video footage of Staverton Station

Heritage railway stations in Devon
Railway stations in Great Britain opened in 1872
Railway stations in Great Britain closed in 1958
Railway stations in Great Britain opened in 1969
Former Great Western Railway stations